S. Noor Mohammad was an Indian politician and former Member of the Legislative Assembly. He was elected to the Tamil Nadu legislative assembly as a Communist Party of India (Marxist) candidate from Padmanabhapuram constituency in Kanyakumari district in 1989 election.

References 

People from Kanyakumari district
Communist Party of India (Marxist) politicians from Tamil Nadu
Living people
Year of birth missing (living people)